Streptomyces solisilvae is a bacterium species from the genus of Streptomyces which has been isolated from soil from a tropical forest on the Bawangling mountain in China.

See also 
 List of Streptomyces species

References 

solisilvae
Bacteria described in 2017